The Shire of Mornington is a local government area in northwestern Queensland, Australia. The shire covers the Wellesley Islands, which includes Mornington Island; the South Wellesley Islands; Bountiful Islands; and  West Wellesley / Forsyth Islands groups in the Gulf of Carpentaria.

History 
The shire includes the traditional lands of a number of Aboriginal Australian peoples.

The shire was formed in 1978 when the Queensland Government decided to take control of the islands over from the Uniting Church of Australia. The local community objected, and asked the Australian federal government to help overturn this decision. After negotiations, it was agreed that the community would become self-governing under a so-called "local government" model.

In 2001, the shire had a population of 934, of whom 88.2% were Indigenous (Aboriginal Australian or Torres Strait Islander).

Geography

The Shire Council covers 26 islands, which make up the Wellesley Islands, South Wellesley Islands, Bountiful Islands and Forsyth Islands (also known as West Wellesley) groups.

The area has abundant flora and fauna, including tea trees, mangroves and sea oaks. The beaches are filled with a variety of marine life, including turtles and the endangered dugong. It is a fishing and diving locale with beaches and an emphasis on ecotourism.

Demography
The islands of the shire are inhabited by the Lardil, Yangkaal, Kaiadilt and Gangalidda peoples. An Australian Aboriginal language, Lardil (also known as Gununa, Ladil), is spoken on Mornington Island and on the Northern Wellesley Islands, all within the Mornington Shire. Another Australian Aboriginal language, Yukulta (also known as Ganggalida), is spoken in the Gulf Country, which includes the local government areas of the Aboriginal Shire of Doomadgee and Shire of Mornington.

The administrative centre of  the shire is the township of Gununa on Mornington Island.

Amenities 
The Mornington Shire Council does not operate any public libraries.

Mayors 

 2008 - 2012: Cecil Goodman 
 2012 - 2020: Bradley Wilson 
2020 - present: Kyle Hector Yanner

References

 
Local government areas of Queensland
North West Queensland
1978 establishments in Australia